is a former Japanese football player and manager. He is currently the manager of J1 League club Vissel Kobe.

Club career
After graduating from high school, he joined Yokohama Flügels with teammate Yasuhiro Hato in 1995. He played many matches as forward from first season and the club won the 1994–95 Asian Cup Winners' Cup. In 1998, the club won Emperor's Cup. In the final, he scored the winning goal. However the club was disbanded at the end of 1998 due to financial strain, he then moved to its merger club Yokohama F. Marinos. However his opportunity to play decreased and he moved to J.League Division 2 Oita Trinita in 2000. He played as offensive midfielder in many matches. The club won the championship in 2002 and was promoted to the first division. He returned to Yokohama F. Marinos in 2006. He moved to his local club Vissel Kobe in 2008. He played many matches until 2011. In 2012, he could not play for injury and the club was relegated to second division. Although he thought of retirement, he extended the contract a year. In 2013, the club finished second and was promoted to first division. He retired at the end of the season.

National team career
In August 1993, Yoshida was selected Japan U17 national team for the 1993 World Championship on home soil and he played 3 matches.

Coaching career
After the retirement, Yoshida started coaching career at Vissel Kobe in 2015. He served a coach under manager Nelsinho Baptista. In August 2017, Nelsinho was sacked for poor results and Yoshida became a new manager as Nelsinho successor. Although Vissel gained Lukas Podolski in July 2017, Vissel finished at the 9th place in 2017 season. In 2018 season, Vissel gained Andrés Iniesta in July and Vissel rose to the 4th place temporarily. However Vissel went down after that and Yoshida resigned in September when the club was at the 10th place. In April 2019, he became a manager again as Juan Manuel Lillo successor. However Vissel won only 1 match in 7 matches and he resigned in June.

Club statistics

Managerial statistics

Honours

Player
Yokohama Flügels
Asian Cup Winners' Cup: 1994–95
Emperor's Cup: 1998
Yokohama F. Marinos
J.League Division 1: 2000
Oita Trinita
J.League Division 2: 2002

References

External links
 
 
 

1977 births
Living people
Association football people from Hyōgo Prefecture
Japanese footballers
Japan youth international footballers
J1 League players
J2 League players
Yokohama Flügels players
Yokohama F. Marinos players
Oita Trinita players
Vissel Kobe players
Japanese football managers
J1 League managers
J2 League managers
Vissel Kobe managers
V-Varen Nagasaki managers
Association football forwards